Fei Dawei is a Paris-based art critic and curator. Born in 1954, Shanghai, he attended the Central Academy of Fine Arts in Beijing in 1985 and belonged to the first generation of art critics and curators in China after the Cultural Revolution. Being largely involved in the 1985-1989 New Wave Movement, often known as the '85 New Wave, Fei is a pioneer of the field who participated in the organization of many influential events in the history of contemporary Chinese art. He is best known for his curatorial works overseas in both Europe and Asia. He emphasizes cross-border cultural communication and denies the idea of "cultural exiles" come up with other domestic critics.

Life and career path
After graduating from the Central Academy of Fine Arts, Beijing with a bachelor's degree in History of Art in 1985, Fei took a major part in organizing the China/Avant-Garde exhibition at the National Art Museum of China in Beijing, along with Li Xianting and Gao Minglu. Meanwhile, he also advised the curators of the Magiciens de la Terre exhibit at the National Museum of Contemporary Art in Paris, France, also known as the Centre Pompidou. After moving permanently to France after being awarded a Chercheur Libre research grant by the French Ministry of Foreign Affairs in 1989, Fei was appointed as the chief curator of the Chine Demain pour Hier exhibition in Pourrieres, France in 1990, which is the first exhibition on Chinese contemporary art. It reveals to the world the six emblematic figures of Cai Guoqiang, Huang Yong Ping, Chen Zhen, Yan Pei Ming, Gu Wenda, Yang Jie Chang. Exceptional installations covered more than 20 hectares of land, making a major impact on the history of Chinese contemporary art. In 1991, he was the chief curator of the Exceptional Passage exhibition, in Fukuoka, Japan (11 hectares) which is the first exhibition on Chinese contemporary art in Japan. Three years later, he was appointed the chief curator of the first Promenade in Asia exhibition in Tokyo, Japan, in collaboration with the cultural branch of Shiseido. (and of the second edition in 1997). In the 1994 CIMAM (International Committee of Museums of Modern Art) conference in Tokyo, Fei was invited as a guest speaker representing China. A year later, he curated the Asiana exhibition during the Venice Biennale, Italy. During 1995 and 2003, he is one of the juries for The UNESCO-Aschberg Bursaries for Artists. Meanwhile, in 1996, he curated the Between Limits exhibition at Sonje Museum, the first exhibition on Chinese contemporary art in South Korea. In 1999, Fei was awarded the title of "Chevalier des Arts et des Lettres" (Knight of Art and Culture) by the French Ministry of Culture. In 2004, he was the chief curator of the All under Heaven exhibition with the MUHKA (Museum of Contemporary Art) and the KMSKA (Royal Museum of Fine Arts) in Antwerp, Belgium and The Monk and The Demon exhibition at the Museum of Contemporary Art in Lyon, France one of the main events of the Year of China in France.

Since 2002, Fei became the director of the Guy & Myriam Ullens Foundation. During those years, he set up and managed the pronounced collection of Chinese contemporary art, and established the Ullence Center for Contemporary Art (UCCA) in Beijing 798 Art District. During 2005 and 2008, Fei was director of the Ullens Center for Contemporary Art (UCCA) in Beijing, China, one of the main museums of the Beijing 798 Art Zone. It is also the first and largest contemporary museum to be set up in China. In 2007, he curated the '85 New Wave Inaugural Exhibition at the Ullence Center for Contemporary Art, of which the success and high artistic quality attracted both national and international acclaim.

Ideas and thoughts

Cultural communication instead of nationalism 
In 1991, Li Xianting wrote a letter to Fei Dawei in which Li used the term "cultural exiles" for artists' activities oversea. Fei Dawei, deeply influenced by Henri Bergson, disputed Li's opinion and insisted that oversea activities and cultural communication could be an internal impetus which would create a new hotbed for new arts to jump outside the framework of nationalism. Below are quotes from Fei's letter to Li.

	Indeed, quite many well-established artists stopped making any progress after migrating to another country. However, can we then vaguely derive a general conclusion from this phenomenon and therefore deny the possibilities that Chinese artists can make art in the foreign context? I think, the reason why most Chinese artists have lost their talents since they went abroad is not only because of the problems in language and real life, but also the constrained thoughts and thinking process grown from their “cultural originality” which keeps them from entering the contemporary culture in a new environment. Such exhaustion of creativity is due to the artists’ incapability to turn what they’ve learned domestically into something free of cultural borders and enduringly effective. Such incapability is derived from the sealed off and conservative culture that is unique to China. Thus, I prefer to reverse your words by saying that “art will exhaust if it does not leave its cultural motherland”. Of course, when I say to “leave”, what I mean is that the art can only develop if it can exceed at least one aspect of its domestic culture. Today’s world is featured by a globalized cultural communication so we can only realize our uniqueness and vitalize our domestic culture by acknowledging and being involved with cross-cultural and cross-disciplinary studies.
	Only when “domestic culture” steps out of the “domain”, it can become an authentic “domestic culture”.
	From my very personal perspective, the so-called “cultural exiles” is actually “ideological exiles” which is nothing more than homesick of those who are driven out and can’t return home. If one can make wherever a home, and be free of homesick and geographical boundaries, “cultural exiles” won’t exist.
       “Cultural exiles” has another layer of meaning: these artists are forced to leave their fixed resources and audiences which both are determined by their working methods; therefore, when being abroad, they are isolated like a fish out of water.
	An exclusive culture sometimes split one’s body and spirit like a wall. In such culture, one’s psyche is constantly wandering in a rootless manner. One’s body being home causes no home for spirit. Therefore, in this sense, such “cultural exiles” can be a kind of internal impetus of a culture.
	National identity is never acquired through pursuits. It is the part revealed spontaneously from every artist’s creative works. It is a result instead of a goal. Every conscious pursuit of the so-called national identity will result in crafty and superficial decorative art. It will eliminate artistic creativity and vilify national culture. Nationalism is the last thing ever wanted but national identity is an inevitable fact regardless of your need – you can only decide how to face it.

Publications and ongoing projects
 85 Xinchao Dang'an I (An Archive of '85 New Wave Movement) 
 85 Xinchao Dang'an II (An Archive of '85 New Wave Movement) 
Various book reviews show appreciation especially to the parts of Huang Yong Ping and Xiamen Dada

Interviews
《迟早要烂掉的，让它们烂得早一些》"Let it go rotten faster" by 21st Century Business Herald/Nanfang Media 
"Chinese contemporary art is experiencing the process of diversifying"  by sina, at the opening of Minsheng Art Museum
"Artists are a kind of bird who eats worms"
"Collecting artworks is way of writing history"
"Manipulation of the prices of contemporary art is rare but serious"  
"Strict censorship keeps China from becoming a culturally developed country"  
"An interview with the chief curator of the contemporary art museum, Fei Dawei"
"Those who criticize '85 Movement have never experienced that"
"Looking for the turning point"
"You make the exhibit or the exhibit makes you"

References

1954 births
Artists from Shanghai
Chinese art critics
Chinese curators
Living people
20th-century Chinese artists
21st-century Chinese artists